Lockhartia oerstedii is a species of orchid native to Mexico, Guatemala, Nicaragua, Honduras, Costa Rica, Panama and Colombia. The species usually grows in mountain forests.

References

oerstedii